Middelfart Stadium is a football stadium in Middelfart, Denmark. It is the home ground of [[Middelfart Boldklub|Middelfart BK]] and has a capacity of 4,000.

The stadium has no lighting system and has a record attendance of 4,100 spectators in 1970 for a match between Middelfart and Esbjerg fB.

See also
List of football stadiums in Denmark

Football venues in Denmark
Buildings and structures in Middelfart Municipality
Sports venues in the Region of Southern Denmark
Middelfart Boldklub